Denis Muhović (born 27 August 1976) is a Bosnian retired karate competitor and current coach of the Bosnia and Herzegovina karate national team.

Personal life
Denis's is the older brother of current leading Bosnian karate competitor Meris Muhović, who he also coaches.

Achievements and awards
2002
 European Championship – 3 May, Tallinn, EST – kumite -80 kg

Awards
Bosnia and Herzegovina Sportsperson of the Year: 2002

References

External links
Denis Muhović at fameflux.com

1976 births
Living people
Bosnia and Herzegovina male karateka
Sportspeople from Pristina
Shotokan practitioners